The chief minister of the Australian Capital Territory is the head of government of the Australian Capital Territory. The leader of the party with the largest number of seats in the unicameral Australian Capital Territory Legislative Assembly usually takes on the role. Unlike other states and territories, the chief minister is not appointed by a governor or administrator, but elected directly by the Assembly.

The chief minister is the rough equivalent of the state premiers, and has been a member of the National Cabinet since its creation in 2020. The chief minister previously also represented the ACT on the Council of Australian Governments (COAG). Since there are no local governments in the territory, the chief minister's role is also similar to that of the mayor of a local government area. The chief minister sits on the Council of Capital City Lord Mayors. 

The current chief minister is Andrew Barr of the Australian Labor Party (ALP), who was first elected by the Assembly on 11 December 2014 following the resignation of Katy Gallagher.

List of chief ministers

1 Lost a no confidence vote in the Assembly originating from allegations made on a television program that the Follett led Labor Government had
sought to secure by persuasion the vote of David Prowse, the Speaker of the Legislative Assembly, for the Business Franchise ("X" Videos) Bill.
2 Lost a no confidence vote in the Assembly following unpopular decisions to close schools, close the Royal Canberra Hospital and amend planning laws that led to the collapse of the Kaine led Liberal Alliance Government with Residents Rally.
3 Resigned when faced with a no confidence vote due to the high costs of the Bruce Stadium renovations; and was replaced by Gary Humphries without the motion being put to the Assembly.
4 Resigned on 12 May 2011 for personal reasons; was replaced by his deputy Katy Gallagher on 16 May 2011 by vote of the Assembly.
5 Resigned on 11 December 2014 to contest the ACT Senate position vacated by Kate Lundy; was replaced by her deputy Andrew Barr.

Graphical timeline

See also
States and territories of Australia (includes some information about the role of the chief minister)
Deputy Chief Minister of the Australian Capital Territory
Australian Capital Territory ministries
List of chief ministers of the Australian Capital Territory by time in office

References

Australian Capital Territory
Australian Capital Territory-related lists